The Davenport Water Co. Pumping Station No. 2, also known as the Ripley Street Pumping Station No. 2, is located in central Davenport, Iowa, United States. It has been listed on the National Register of Historic Places since 1984. The historic building has subsequently been replaced in 1986 by a smaller plain structure on the same property facing West 14th Street.

History
Unlike most other municipalities in Iowa, Davenport has always had a privately run water company.  A waterworks was first proposed for the city in 1856. However, the Davenport Water Company was not formed until 1873 under the leadership of Michael P. Donahue, who was granted an exclusive franchise with the city. Initially, they installed  of water mains and 245 hydrants throughout the city. The system was used to fight its first fire in 1874 and it was promoted as a way to fight cholera.

There were some problems with the new water system in Davenport. Water pressure was significantly lowered if the hydrants were used to fight a fire. In 1884 the company built the Ripley Street Pumping Station No. 2. The facility had a reservoir that can hold  of water. The pumping system was operated by a vertical set of compound Clapp and Jones Pumps and a set of Duplex Gordon Steam Pumps.

A mechanical filtering system installed the previous year helped make the company's product more saleable and more properties in the city were converted from private wells. Another pumping station was built around the turn of the 20th century along East River Drive near the Village of East Davenport.

This facility is significant because of its association with the development of the Davenport Water Company and the growth of the residential areas of the city above the bluff line in the period of 1880-1920. It was further enhanced by the building's continued original use and retaining most of its integrity.

Architecture
The exterior treatment of Pumping Station #2 was similar to many other late 19th-century industrial buildings in Davenport. It featured brick construction, walls that were articulated as panels by pilasters, and a simple corbel table. The use of buff-colored brick for the window heads was less common. The building was also more ornate at one time. The two-story pavilion section had a crested, mansard roof. Until about 1890 only the three-panel south wing was in existence. The north wing and the extension of the south wing by two panels were later additions.

References

Former buildings and structures in Davenport, Iowa
Infrastructure completed in 1884
Industrial buildings and structures on the National Register of Historic Places in Iowa
Water supply pumping stations on the National Register of Historic Places
National Register of Historic Places in Davenport, Iowa
Italianate architecture in Iowa
Demolished buildings and structures in Iowa